Akbar At-Taqwa Grand Mosque is a mosque located in Bengkulu City, Bengkulu Province, Indonesia, and it serves as the main mosque of the city. The groundbreaking of the mosque begun in 1988 and the construction finished in 1989. The mosque resembles the colonial-era palace building as seen from the park, and is spacious with the arrangement of a garden in the courtyard and a small square in the palace yard.

See also
 Islam in Indonesia
 List of mosques in Indonesia

Further reading 
 

Bengkulu
Buildings and structures in West Sumatra
Cultural Properties of Indonesia in West Sumatra
Mosques completed in 1989
Mosques in Indonesia